Nadiia Volodymyrivna Khavanska (born 2 April 1989) is a Ukrainian footballer, who plays as a midfielder for Turkish club 1207 Antalya Spor, and the Ukraine women's national team.

Club career

In Ukraine 
At the beginning of her career, Khavanska played for the Luhansk-based club Zorya-Spartak. In 2008, she moved to Illichivka Mariupol. She scored her debut goal for the team from Mariupol on 23 May 2009 in a home match of the Ukrainian Women's League against Yatran-Berestivts. She spent two seasons in the team. In 2011, she strengthened Yatran-Berestivets, for which she made her debut on 30 April 2011 in an away match of the Ukrainian League against Naftokhimik Kalush. She spent one season in the team, played in six matches and scored three goals of the championship of Ukraine. 

In 2017, she returned home to play for  Zhytlobud-1 Kharkiv. She made h er debut in the Ukrainian League match against Rodyna Lyceum on 22 April 2017. She scored her debut goal for "Zhytlobud-1" on 30 April 2017 in a home match of the Ukainian League against Zlagody-Dnipro-1.

In Rıssia 
She scored the only one goal for Ryazan, and that in 2013 in a home match of the Russian Premier League against Mordovochka Saransk. 
 In two and half seasons with Ryazan-VDV, she played 34 matches scoring one goal in the top league of Russia. In the 2013 season, she enjoyed her team's champion title in Russia. As of 2015, she played in the first league of Russia for Donchanka Azov.

In Turkey 
By March 2022, Khavanska moved to Turkey and signed with the Istanbul-based club Ataşehir Belediyespor to play in the second half of the 2021-22 Women's Super League season. The next season, she transferred to 11207 Antalya Spor.

International career 
Khavanska has been capped for the Ukraine national team, appearing for the team during the 2019 FIFA Women's World Cup qualifying cycle.

Honours 
 Ukrainian Women's League
 Zhytlobud-1 Kharkiv
 Champions (1): 2017-18
 Runners-up (1): 2017

 Russian Women's Football Championship
 Ryazan-VDV
 'Champions (1): 2013

References

External links 
 
 
 

1989 births
Living people
Ukrainian women's footballers
Women's association football midfielders
WFC Zhytlobud-1 Kharkiv players
Ukraine women's international footballers
Ukrainian expatriate women's footballers
Ukrainian expatriate sportspeople in Russia
Expatriate women's footballers in Russia
Ryazan-VDV players
Ukrainian expatriate sportspeople in Turkey
Expatriate women's footballers in Turkey
Turkish Women's Football Super League players
1207 Antalya Spor players